Grin & Bear It is The Ruts' 1980 second album and features a compilation of singles, B-sides and live performances recorded at London's Marquee Club. The cover artwork was by Oliver Howard.

"In a Rut"/"H Eyes" was the first single recorded at Fairdeal 8-track studio in Hayes in May 1978.  Originally to be released as an EP with a considerably slower version of "Society" on Misty in Roots’ own label People Unite.

"Love in Vain" was the B-side of "Staring at the Rude Boys", and it was produced and engineered (for Dukeslodge Enterprises) at Air and Townhouse Studios, February 1980.  Brass was added later.

"Staring at the Rude Boys" was covered by U.S. hardcore band Dag Nasty in 1987 and by English hardcore punk band Gallows in 2007.

"Demolition Dancing"/"Secret Soldiers" are taken from the John Peel radio session recorded in February 1980.
 
"S.U.S."/"Babylon’s Burning"/"Society" were recorded live in late 1979 and mixed live onto 2-track with no overdubs.

The cassette version of this album claims that the live material was recorded "live for Chorus in Paris 7 January 1980".

The track "S.U.S." was an attack on a 1970s UK law under which the police were able to stop people on the street and arrest them ‘on suspicion’ of causing (or being about to commit) a crime.  This came to be known as the "Sus law", and was widely regarded in some areas as being used as a justification by the police for the harassment of the young and racial minorities.  The law was eventually repealed.

Track listing

Personnel
The Ruts
 Malcolm Owen - vocals
 Paul Fox - guitar
 John "Segs" Jennings - bass
 Dave Ruffy - drums; bass on "Lobotomy" and "Rich Bitch"
with:
 Gary Barnacle - saxophone on "West One (Shine On Me)" and "Love in Vain"
 Bill Barnacle - trumpet on "Love in Vain"
 Bill Barnacle's Horns - brass on "Love in Vain"
 Paul Mattock - drums on "Lobotomy" and "Rich Bitch"

References

The Ruts albums
1980 compilation albums
Virgin Records compilation albums